Torsten Henning Johansson (17 January 1906 – 8 January 1989) was a Swedish footballer who played as a midfielder for IFK Norrköping and the Sweden national team. He competed in the men's tournament at the 1936 Summer Olympics.

References

External links
 
 

1906 births
1989 deaths
Sportspeople from Norrköping
Swedish footballers
Footballers from Östergötland County
Association football midfielders
IFK Norrköping players
Sweden international footballers
Olympic footballers of Sweden
Footballers at the 1936 Summer Olympics